Jacques Restout (c. 1650 – c. 1701) was a French painter of the Restout dynasty (the son of Marc Restout) and a Premonstratensian canon regular. Born in Caen, he was a student of Le Tellier and became prior of the abbaye de Moncets near Reims.

Works
 La Réforme de la Peinture, Caen, J. Briard, 1681
 Traité de l’harmonie des sons
Translation of Pausanias, surviving in manuscript form
Translation of a Treatise on the Painting on the Ancients by Franciscus Junius le Jeune, surviving in manuscript form

References
 Édouard Frère, Manuel du bibliographe normand, Rouen, Le Brument, 1860
 Philippe de Chennevières, Recherches sur la vie et les ouvrages de quelques peintres provinciaux de l'ancienne France, Paris, Dumoulin, 1847–1862

1650 births
1701 deaths
Artists from Caen
Premonstratensians
French Baroque painters
French Christian monks
17th-century French people 
17th-century Christian monks